The following is the filmography of American actor, filmmaker, singer, songwriter and musician Billy Bob Thornton.

Film

Television

Video games

Web

See also
 List of awards and nominations received by Billy Bob Thornton
 Billy Bob Thornton discography

References

External links

 
 
 

Male actor filmographies
Director filmographies
American filmographies